Izvorul Negru may refer to the following rivers in Romania:

 Izvorul Negru, a tributary of the Asău in Bacău County
 Izvorul Negru, a tributary of the Râușor in Maramureș County
 Izvorul Negru (Uz), a tributary of the Uz in Bacău County
 Izvorul Negru, a tributary of the Vișeu in Maramureș County

See also 
 Izvorul (disambiguation)
 Negrea (disambiguation)
 Negrișoara (disambiguation)